Terror Mountain is a 1928 American silent Western film directed by Louis King and written by Frank Howard Clark and Helen Gregg. The film stars Tom Tyler, Jane Reid, Al Ferguson, Jules Cowles and Frankie Darro. The film was released on August 19, 1928, by Film Booking Offices of America. It was also released as Terror and Tom's Vacation.

Plot
Two young orphans, Buddy and Lucille Roberts, living in an old dark mansion atop a mountain are assailed regularly by ghostly apparitions and mysterious death threats. They enlist the aid of a famous Hollywood Western movie star named Tom Tyler (with Tyler actually playing himself in the film) to investigate the situation and help them discover who is menacing them. It turns out a bunch of crooks have been using the old house as a hideout, and they were the ones trying to scare the kids into leaving so that the children would never discover the valuable cache of silver hidden years before in the house by their deceased uncle. Tyler captures the gang and turns them over to the authorities, then makes sure the siblings get their uncle's valuable stash. He caps off the film by adopting the two misfortunates and relocating them to his beautiful Hollywood estate.

Cast         
 Tom Tyler as Tom Tyler
 Jane Reid as Lucille Roberts
 Al Ferguson as Luke Thorne
 Jules Cowles as Jed Burke
 Frankie Darro as Buddy Roberts

References

External links
 

1928 films
1928 Western (genre) films
Film Booking Offices of America films
Films directed by Louis King
American black-and-white films
Silent American Western (genre) films
1920s English-language films
1920s American films